Dr. Kapil Deva Dvivedi is the director of Vishva Bharati Research Institute, and a noted Sanskrit scholar in India. He has published over 70 books on Vedic and Sanskrit Literature. In 1991 he was awarded a Padma Shri for Literature & Education.

He has received several awards for his contribution in Sanskrit Grammar.

Some of his awarded books are:

Artha-Vigyana Aur Vyakarana-Darshana
Sanskrit Vyakarana
Sanskrit Nibandha Shatakam
Rashtra Gitanjalih
Bhakti Kusumanjalih
Atharva Veda ka Sanskritik Adhyayana
Vedon Men Ayurveda
Atma Vijnanam
Vedon Men Rajniti Shastra
Vedon men Vigyan
Sanskrit Vyakaran evam Laghusiddhantkaumudi

Family Background - 
His native place was Gyanpur (U.P). He has 7 children - 2 daughters and 5 sons. There name - Bhartendu, Dharmendu, Gyanendu, Vishwendu, Aryendu

References

External links
https://web.archive.org/web/20110719102038/http://www.new.dli.ernet.in/scripts/FullindexDefault.htm?path1=%2Frawdataupload%2Fupload%2F0098%2F904&first=1&last=425&barcode=5990010098904
https://books.google.com/books?hl=en&id=QA1V7sICaIwC&dq=who's+who+of+Indian+writers+1999&printsec=frontcover&source=web&ots=iZn4e4VQGb&sig=WBSJg_wL5Cu583hipwqZY_mjfQc&sa=X&oi=book_result&resnum=1&ct=result#PPA351,M1

Recipients of the Padma Shri in literature & education
Living people
People from Ghazipur
People from Bhadohi district
Sanskrit writers
Year of birth missing (living people)